Katherine Gabriela Miranda Chang (born 11 February 1994 in Lima) is a Peruvian former tennis player.

She won three doubles titles on the ITF Women's Circuit in her career. On 13 August 2012, she reached her best singles ranking of world No. 740. On 22 October 2012, she peaked at No. 539 in the doubles rankings.

Playing for Peru in the Fed Cup, Miranda Chang has a win–loss record of 1–7.

ITF finals

Doubles (3–4)

Fed Cup participation

Singles (0–3)

Doubles (1–4)

References

External links
 
 
 

1994 births
Living people
Sportspeople from Lima
Peruvian female tennis players
Peruvian people of Chinese descent
20th-century Peruvian women
21st-century Peruvian women